The 1962 Canada Cup took place 8–11 November at Jockey Club Golf in San Isidro, Buenos Aires, Argentina. It was the 10th Canada Cup event, which became the World Cup in 1967. The tournament was a 72-hole stroke play team event with 34 teams. These were the same teams that had competed in 1961 but without Paraguay and with the addition of Ecuador and Panama. Each team consisted of two players from a country. The combined score of each team determined the team results. The American team of Arnold Palmer and Sam Snead won by two strokes over the Argentine team of Fidel de Luca and Roberto De Vicenzo. The individual competition was won by Roberto De Vicenzo, who finished two shots ahead of Englishman Peter Alliss and Arnold Palmer.

Teams

Source

Cerdá was representing Mexico, having played for Argentina from 1953 to 1957.

Scores
Team

Eric Brown of Scotland withdrew during the first round.

International Trophy

Source

References

World Cup (men's golf)
Golf tournaments in Argentina
Canada Cup
Canada Cup
Canada Cup